New Hampshire Route 103 (abbreviated NH 103) is a  east–west highway in west-central New Hampshire, United States. The highway runs from Claremont, at the Vermont border on the Connecticut River, to Hopkinton, west of Concord.

The western terminus of NH 103 is in Claremont at the New Hampshire–Vermont state line on the Connecticut River, running concurrently with New Hampshire Route 12. After intersecting with New Hampshire Route 12A, the road continues eastward for  into the center of Claremont, where NH 103 splits off from NH 12 and merges with New Hampshire Route 11. The road splits off from NH 11 east of Newport. The eastern terminus of NH 103 is in Hopkinton at U.S. Route 202 and New Hampshire Route 9.

Major intersections

Suffixed routes

New Hampshire Route 103A

New Hampshire Route 103A (abbreviated NH 103A) is a  secondary north–south highway in Merrimack County, New Hampshire. NH 103A connects New London with Newbury. NH 103A runs down the entire length of the east side of Lake Sunapee and provides access to the local roads along the lakeshore. NH 103A is locally named Lakeside Road.

The southern terminus of NH 103A is at New Hampshire Route 103 at the south end of the lake. The northern terminus is at New Hampshire Route 11, Newport Road, at the north end of the lake near Interstate 89.

New Hampshire Route 103B

New Hampshire Route 103B (abbreviated NH 103B) is a  secondary north–south highway located predominantly in Sullivan County (with a small segment in Merrimack County) in western New Hampshire. NH 103B connects Newbury with Sunapee. NH 103B runs along the western shore of Lake Sunapee and provides access to the local roads along the lakeshore. NH 103B is locally named Edgemont Road.

The southern terminus of NH 103B is at New Hampshire Route 103 on the southwest side of the lake. The road runs north into the village of Sunapee about midway up the west side of the lake. The northern terminus of NH 103B is at the junction with New Hampshire Route 11 in the village center.

References

External links

 New Hampshire State Route 103 on Flickr
 New Hampshire State Route 103A on Flickr
 New Hampshire State Route 103B on Flickr

103
Transportation in Sullivan County, New Hampshire
Transportation in Merrimack County, New Hampshire